The 2020 Grand Prix Zagreb Open was a wrestling event held in Zagreb, Croatia between 07 and 08 of November 2020.

Medal table

Team ranking

Men's Greco-Roman 
November 7–08, 2020

Participating nations

56 competitors from 6 nations participated.
(15)
(7)
(11)
(9)
(1)
(14)

References 

2020 in sport wrestling
2020 in Croatian sport
International wrestling competitions hosted by Croatia
Sport in Zagreb
Wrestling in Croatia